The Vanuatu national under-23 football team, also known as Vanuatu Cyclone, represents Vanuatu at U23 tournaments. The team is considered to be the feeder team for the Vanuatu national football team. They are controlled by the Vanuatu Football Federation. The team has gained notoriety for thrashing Micronesia's side 46–0 in the 2015 Pacific Games.

History
Vanuatu U23 made four appearances so far at the OFC U23 Championship. Their best result was a third place in 2012. In 2015 they will make their fifth appearance during the 2015 Pacific Games in Papua New Guinea but before that, they will play a tournament called the Four Nation’s Friendship Cup.

OFC
The OFC Men's Olympic Qualifying Tournament is a tournament held once every four years to decide the only qualification spot for Oceania Football Confederation (OFC) and representatives at the Olympic Games.

Fixtures & Matches

2015

2019

Current Technical Staff

Current squad
The following players were called to the squad for the 2019 OFC Men's Olympic Qualifying Tournament from 21 September - 5 October 2019.
Caps and goals updated as of 5 October 2019 after the match against .

Squad for the Four Nation’s Friendship Cup
The following players were called to the squad for the 2015 Pacific Games from 3–17 July 2015.Caps and goals updated as of 10 July 2015 after the match against .

List of coaches
  Richard Iwai (2012-2015)
  Etienne Mermer (2019-2022)
  George Amos (2022)
  Emerson Alcantara (2022-)

Oceanian national under-23 association football teams
Under-23